Pseudocyonopsis is a member of the extinct family Amphicyonidae, a terrestrial carnivore belonging to the order Caniformia.

Pseudocyonopsis was named by Kuss in 1965 and was assigned to Amphicyonidae by Carroll (1988).

Species
 P. ambiguus
 P. antiquus
 P. quercensis

References

Bear dogs
Oligocene caniforms
Prehistoric carnivoran genera